A referendum on autonomy was held in French Togoland on 28 October 1956. Since World War I, the territory had been a League of Nations mandate and then a United Nations Trust Territory under French control. The referendum offered residents the choice of remaining a Trust Territory or becoming an autonomous region within the French Union. The result was 93% in favour of the latter, with a 77.3% turnout. However, the referendum was rejected by the United Nations General Assembly as it had not included the option of independence and opted to continue with the trusteeship. In neighbouring British Togoland, a referendum earlier in the year had resulted in the territory becoming part of Ghana.

The trusteeship was ended in 1960 when French Togoland became independent as Togo.

Results

References

French Togoland
Autonomy referendum
French Togoland
Referendums in Togo
French Togoland
French Togoland